Erkan Özbey (born 10 February 1978 in Rize, Turkey) is a Turkish retired football player. He played as a defender.

External links
 Gençlerbirliği Site Profile
 Profile at TFF.org

1978 births
Living people
Turkish footballers
Turkey international footballers
Turkey B international footballers
Turkey under-21 international footballers
Süper Lig players
Gençlerbirliği S.K. footballers
Bursaspor footballers
Kardemir Karabükspor footballers

Association football defenders
Sportspeople from Rize